is a Japanese basketball coach and a former player. He was college basketball coach of National Institute of Fitness and Sports in Kanoya, Westmont College, and St. John's University.

On 9 July 2016, Shogo signed with Yokohama B-Corsairs in the Japanese B.League for the 2019–20 season.

Personal life
He earned a 3.64 grade point average (GPA) at St. John's University.

Head coaching record

|- 
| style="text-align:left;"|Yokohama B-Corsairs
| style="text-align:left;"|2019-20
| 9||3||6|||| style="text-align:center;"|5th in Central|||-||-||-||
| style="text-align:center;"|-
|-

References

1949 births
Living people
Japanese basketball coaches
Japan national basketball team coaches
Yokohama B-Corsairs coaches